Ganisa gyraleus is a moth in the family Eupterotidae. It is found in Thailand.

References

Moths described in 2000
Eupterotinae
Moths of Asia